Giulia Maenza is an Italian fashion model and actress.

Early life 
Maenza was born in Sicily, to Nicola, a physical education teacher, and Concetta, an accountant. She has two older brothers, Davide and Marco

Career 
Maenza was discovered at a stadium by a former model. She debuted as a semi-exclusive for Versace, also walking for Dolce & Gabbana (who would be come a frequent collaborator), Ermanno Scervino, Moschino, DSquared2, Giambattista Valli, Elie Saab, Armani Privé, Christopher Kane, Max Mara, Blumarine, Miu Miu, Azzedine Alaïa, and Oscar de la Renta. She has appeared in advertisements for Bvlgari, Chopard, shoemaker René Caovilla, Topshop, Dolce & Gabbana, and Express. Editorially, she has appeared in Vogue Italia, Vogue Spain, Vogue Paris, Marie Claire, Vogue Japan, Vanity Fair France, and Vogue Germany.

Filmography

References

External links
 

Living people
2000 births
Italian female models
Italian film actresses
Italian television actresses
Models from Sicily
21st-century Italian actresses
Actresses from Palermo